The Knight of Newts is an adventure for the Rules Cyclopedia edition of the Dungeons & Dragons fantasy role-playing game, published in 1993.

Publication history
The Knight of Newts was written by Dale "Slade" Henson. Doug Stewart was the editor. Cover art was by David Dorman, with interior art by Dave Simons and Karl Waller.

Contents
This beginner's module (for level 1–2 players) is 16-pages long.

 The Newt, A New Monster
 New Color Monster Standups
 New Magical Items
 Color Poster Map
 New Rules for Adventuring Underwater

Reception
Keith H. Eisenbeis reviewed the module in issue No. 38 of White Wolf magazine. He stated that the "module's strong point is  simplicity, which is highly desirable for very inexperienced players", and compared it to the "Dungeonquest" and "Dragonquest" games. He noted that it would also be "boring to the more experienced". Eisenbeis rated the accessory an overall 2 out of a possible 5.

References

Dungeons & Dragons modules
Mystara
Role-playing game supplements introduced in 1993